WPTR may refer to:

 WPTR (AM), a radio station (1240 AM) licensed to serve Schenectady, New York, United States
 WMHH (96.7 MHz), which held the WPTR from 2004 to 2011
 WAJZ (96.3 MHz), which held the WPTR calls from 1996 to 1999
 WDCD (AM) (1540 kHz), longtime holder of the WPTR calls from 1948 to 1995 and again from 2000 to 2004